Epermenia wockeella is a moth of the  family Epermeniidae. It is found in Turkey and Turkmenistan.

References

Moths described in 1880
Epermeniidae
Moths of Asia
Insects of Central Asia